Formula One, abbreviated to F1, is the highest class of open-wheeled auto racing defined by the Fédération Internationale de l'Automobile (FIA), motorsport's world governing body. The "formula" in the name refers to a set of rules to which all participants and cars must conform. The World Drivers' Championship is presented by the FIA to the most successful Formula One driver over the course of the season through a points system based on individual Grand Prix results. The World Championship is won when it is no longer mathematically possible for another competitor to overtake their points total regardless of the outcome of the remaining races, although it is not officially awarded until the FIA Prize Giving Ceremony held in various cities following the conclusion of the season.

Michael Schumacher and Lewis Hamilton hold the record for the most World Drivers' Championships, both having won the title on seven occasions. Juan Manuel Fangio is third with five titles. Nico Rosberg has the highest number of Grand Prix starts before winning his first title, a period of 206  between the 2006 Bahrain and the 2016 Abu Dhabi Grand Prix. Sebastian Vettel is the youngest winner of the World Drivers' Championship; he was 23 years and 134 days old when he won the  championship. Fangio is the oldest winner of the World Drivers' Championship; he was 46 years and 41 days old when he won the  title.

As of the  season, out of the 770 drivers who have started a Formula One Grand Prix, the 73 titles awarded have been won by a total of 34 different drivers. The first Formula One World Drivers' Champion was Giuseppe Farina in the  championship and the current title holder is Max Verstappen in the  season. The title has been won by drivers from the United Kingdom 20 times between 10 drivers, more than any other nation, followed by Brazil, Finland and Germany with three drivers each. The title has been won by drivers from Scuderia Ferrari 15 times between 9 drivers, more than any other team, followed by McLaren with 12 titles between 7 drivers. The Drivers' Championship has been won in the final race of the season 30 times in the 72 seasons it has been awarded. Schumacher holds the record of earning the championship with most  left to run in a season with six when he won the  title at that year's .



By season

By driver

Drivers in bold have competed in the 2023 World Championship.

By driver nationality

Drivers in bold have competed in the 2023 World Championship.

Records

Youngest Drivers' Champion

Where drivers have won more than one World Drivers' Championship, only their first win is noted here. Drivers in bold have competed in the 2023 World Championship.

Oldest Drivers' Champion

Drivers in bold have competed in the 2023 World Championship.

Consecutive Drivers' Championships
A total of 11 drivers have achieved consecutive wins in the World Drivers' Championship. Of those, only Michael Schumacher and Lewis Hamilton have won two sets of consecutive Formula One Drivers' Championships.

Drivers in bold have competed in the 2023 World Championship.

Drivers' Champions for constructors that did not win the Constructors' Championship in that year 

Drivers in bold have competed in the 2023 World Championship.

By chassis constructor
Constructors in bold have competed in the 2023 World Championship.

By engine manufacturer
Engine manufacturers in bold have competed in the 2023 World Championship.

By tyres used
Tyre manufacturers in bold have competed in the 2023 World Championship.

Numbers in parentheses indicate championships won as the sole tyre supplier.

See also

 History of Formula One
 List of Formula One driver records
 List of Formula One drivers

References

External links 
 
 FIA official website

World Champions
 
World Champions Drivers
Formula One
Formula One World Drivers' Champions
Formula One